Frodsham is a surname. Notable people with the surname include:

Alf Frodsham, English rugby league footballer who played in the 1920s and 1930s and coached in the 1940s
Charles Frodsham (1810–1871), English watch and clockmaker
Eric Frodsham (1923–2003), English rugby league footballer
Gareth Frodsham (born 1989), English rugby league footballer
George Horsfall Frodsham (1863–1937), DD, English-born Anglican Bishop of North Queensland
Ian Frodsham (1975–1995), English association footballer who was at Liverpool
John Frodsham (1930–2016) Emeritus Professor of English and Comparative Literature at Murdoch University, Western Australia, Sinologist and translator of Chinese literature

See also
Frodsham Hodson, principal of Brasenose College, Oxford
Frodsham, market town in Cheshire, England